Koum is a surname. Notable people with the surname include:

 Daniel Koum (born 1985), Cameroon-born Australian weightlifter
 Emmanuel Koum (1946–2008), Cameroonian football player
 Jan Koum (born 1976), CEO and founder of WhatsApp

See also
 Kou (name)